The following is a summary of the 2012–13 season of competitive football in Switzerland.

Men's national team
The home team is on the left column; the away team is on the right column.

2014 World Cup qualification

Friendly matches

Men's Olympic national team
The home team is on the left column; the away team is on the right column.

2012 Summer Olympics

Women's national team
The home team is on the left column; the away team is on the right column.

Euro 2013 qualifying

2012 Cyprus Cup

2013 Cyprus Cup

Friendly matches

League standings

Raiffeisen Super League

Challenge League

1. Liga Promotion

 
Seasons in Swiss football
2012 in Swiss sport
2013 in Swiss sport